Ettore Molinari (1867–1926) was an Italian chemist and anarchist.

References 

1867 births
1926 deaths
Italian anarchists
Italian chemists